Albert Görtz (born 18 November 1933) is a German former footballer who played as a goalkeeper. He competed for West Germany in the men's tournament at the 1956 Summer Olympics.

References

External links
 

1933 births
Living people
Footballers from Düsseldorf
German footballers
Association football goalkeepers
Olympic footballers of the United Team of Germany
Footballers at the 1956 Summer Olympics
Fortuna Düsseldorf players
20th-century German people
West German footballers